Mark Irwin Forstater (born 1943) is an American film and TV producer, author, audio producer, music producer and tech entrepreneur, notable for producing the classic comedy film Monty Python and the Holy Grail  and then in 2012 suing the five living members of Monty Python over a dispute regarding royalties from merchandising income, including the Spamalot musical, which was "lovingly ripped off from" the Holy Grail movie. He is a graduate of London Film School.  He has resided in the United Kingdom since 1964.

Forstater also produced the cult science fiction  classic Xtro. and his latest film is called Swipe Fever, a rom-com for Gen Z and Millennial audiences, scheduled for theatre release on Swipe Fever Day October 7 2023. Alongside Swipe Fever’s composer and director Nathan Neuman, Forstater is also launching a web3 platform called Dreambird which intends to democratise the film industry.

Childhood and education 
Forstater was born in Philadelphia and is Jewish. He was educated in Philadelphia public schools and graduated in the 216 class of Central High School. He attended and graduated from Temple University, also in Philadelphia. He moved to England in 1964 to read English Literature at the University of Manchester as a visiting student.

Career 
In 1968, Forstater attended the London School of Film Technique, but had to leave after one term due to lack of funds. He found a job as an assistant editor on ITV Anglia's Survival. In his spare time, he produced his first feature film - The Great Wall of China (B/W, 16mm), directed by Joel Tuber. Forstater also made two short films for the BFI Production Board. In 1971 he started Chippenham Films with Julian Doyle.

During his time at City College of New York Film School, Forstater met fellow student Terry Gilliam and they shared a flat in NYC. In 1969, Forstater and Gilliam reunited in London and Gilliam introduced him to Michael Palin and Terry Jones, future members of the Monty Python group. After the failure of their first film, And Now for Something Completely Different, the Pythons decided to make an original film and asked Forstater to produce it. This film became Monty Python and The Holy Grail which was an instant success and has become a comedy classic, acclaimed as one of the top comedy films of all time. Forstater has written extensively about the making of the film and a subsequent legal battle over Spamalot royalties in his book The 7th Python.

Forstater has made over 30 films in a career lasting until today. He was a pioneer in making films in Africa, including The Grass Is Singing, from the novel by Doris Lessing, made in Zambia and directed by Michael Raeburn, and Marigolds in August, by Athol Fugard, directed by Ross Devenish.

In 1981, Forstater produced the cult classic Xtro directed by Harry Bromley Davenport. Other notable productions include: The Wolves of Willoughby Chase, from the book by Joan Aiken, directed by Stuard Orme; the Cannes official selection Between the Devil and the Deep Blue Sea, directed by Marion Hänsel; Forbidden, directed by Anthony Page; The Cold Room, directed by James Dearden; The Fantasist, written and directed by Robin Hardy; and The Glitterball, directed by Harley Cokliss.

Forstater also produced a drama series Grushko for BBC1, and a number of documentaries for Channel 4 and the BBC. He has also produced an album of Chinese folk music.

In 1999, Forstater produced his first audio – the Tao Te Ching, with Nigel Hawthorne reading the text. This led to a Forstater writing and producing a series of four books and audiobooks on spirituality and philosophy – The Spiritual Teachings of Marcus Aurelius, The Spiritual Teachings of the Tao, The Spiritual Teachings of Yoga, and The Spiritual Teachings of Seneca. Forstater has written three further books: The Living Wisdom of Socrates, I Survived a Secret Nazi Extermination Camp, and the autobiographical The 7th Python.

In 2018, Forstater started a new company with video producer and composer Nathan Neuman, to explore new digital entertainment possibilities, such a VR and AR. Forstater produced his latest film Swipe Fever, directed by Nathan Neuman during lockdown in 2020, and is scheduled for theatrical release in the UK in February 2023. Forstater and Neuman have created a new Web3 internet platform that will revolutionise film and TV production – Dreambird, and will create its own currency – the Dreambird Token. Dreambird Studios has a slate of 15 films that it intends to make for the new Dreambird platform.

Legal Battles 

On 4 July 2013, he won the High Court of Justice case against the surviving members of Monty Python over royalty payments to Spamalot as a derivative work of Monty Python and the Holy Grail. They owed £1.3 million in past royalties and legal fees, prompting them to produce Monty Python Live (Mostly) in 2014 to pay their debt.

Personal life 
Forstater lives in London. He has been married twice, has four daughters, including Maya Forstater, and 3 grandsons.

Forstater has said that the protracted Spamalot royalties case was greatly detrimental to his well-being, both financially and mentally.

Films produced 
Killing Heat
Monty Python and the Holy Grail
Marigolds in August
The Glitterball
The Fantasist
Xtro

Books 
The Seventh Python – A Twat's Tale
I Survived a Secret Nazi Extermination Camp (2013). Forstater was inspired to write this unique memoir 'a retelling of his own stateside family history, […] a meditation for the extended family he never knew' who died in the Belzec extermination camp after he read the memoirs of Rudolf Reder, 'one of two known Jewish survivors of […] Belzec', where 600,000 Jews and Roma were killed. Reder's memoir is included in Forstater's book. Several of Forstater's relatives were murdered in the Belzec camp.
The Spiritual Teachings of Marcus Aurelius (Harper, 2000)
The Age of Anxiety: A Guided Meditation for the Financially Stressed

References

External links 
 

Living people
British film producers
Monty Python
1943 births
Alumni of the London Film School
American emigrants to the United Kingdom
20th-century British Jews
21st-century British Jews
Jewish film people